Joshua Harris Wright (born 18 September 1988) is an English former footballer who played as a midfielder in the Football League for Darlington.

Wright was born in Hartlepool in 1988. He joined League Two club Darlington from Barnsley's youth academy, and made his debut on 26 December 2006 as a second-half substitute for a team "crippled by injury and illness" that lost 2–0 at home to Mansfield Town. It was his only first-team appearance before he moved into non-league football, playing for clubs including Brodsworth Welfare (two spells), Wakefield, Winterton Rangers, Emley, Staveley Miners Welfare, Pontefract Collieries and Worsbrough Bridge Athletic, with whom he suffered serious ligament damage.

References

1988 births
Living people
Footballers from Hartlepool
English footballers
Association football midfielders
Barnsley F.C. players
Darlington F.C. players
Brodsworth Welfare A.F.C. players
Wakefield F.C. players
Winterton Rangers F.C. players
Emley A.F.C. players
Staveley Miners Welfare F.C. players
Pontefract Collieries F.C. players
Worsbrough Bridge Athletic F.C. players
English Football League players
Northern Counties East Football League players
Northern Premier League players